Dipat is a Greek spiritual dance. It is the second-most popular Pontian dance, behind only the Horon.

See also
Greek dances
Greek music

References

Greek dances
Pontic Greek dances